Monkey King is a leading New Zealand Standardbred racehorse. He is most noted for winning the New Zealand Trotting Cup and New Zealand Free-For-All double in two consecutive years, in 2009 and 2010, the first time this has ever been achieved. He also won the Miracle Mile Pace and the Auckland Trotting Cup in the 2009/10 season, as well as running second in the Inter Dominion Grand Final. As a result, he achieved the highest-earning season ever by a New Zealand pacer, and was crowned New Zealand Horse of the Year. These victories came after several top successes as a 3 and 4 year-old and consistently rating among the top horses in New Zealand over the following years. He is now New Zealand's richest ever pacer with over $3,400,000 in stakes.

Monkey King was selected by the North Island horse trainer Steven Reid. He trained the horse up to early 2009 until the owner moved the horse to a South Island establishment in Christchurch.

Major race wins
 2009 Miracle Mile Pace
 2009 New Zealand Free For All
 2009 New Zealand Trotting Cup
 2010 Auckland Trotting Cup
 2010 New Zealand Free For All
 2010 New Zealand Trotting Cup

See also

 Harness racing in New Zealand

Miracle Mile winners
New Zealand standardbred racehorses
New Zealand Trotting Cup winners
2002 racehorse births
Auckland Pacing Cup winners